The final of the Women's Javelin Throw event at the 2001 World Championships in Edmonton, Alberta, Canada was held on Monday August 6, 2001. There were a total number of 22 participating athletes, with the qualification mark was set at 61.00 metres. Cuba's eventual winner Osleidys Menéndez broke the event record twice during the final, in her second (69.42 metres) and third attempt (69.53 metres).

Medalists

Schedule
All times are Mountain Standard Time (UTC−7)

Abbreviations
All results shown are in metres

Records

Qualification

Group A

Group B

Final

See also
 1998 Women's European Championships Javelin Throw (Budapest)
 2000 Women's Olympic Javelin Throw (Sydney)
 2002 Women's European Championships Javelin Throw (Munich)
 2004 Women's Olympic Javelin Throw (Athens)

References
 Results
 RecProgression
 IAAF

J
Javelin throw at the World Athletics Championships
2001 in women's athletics